Vlasikha is a closed urban locality (a work settlement) in Moscow Oblast, Russia. It serves as the headquarters of the Strategic Missile Troops of Russia. Population:

History
A closed administrative-territorial formation was established on the territory of the closed military townlet #22/1 on January 19, 2009. On August 5, 2009, Boris Gromov, the Governor of Moscow Oblast, issued a Resolution which transformed the military townlet into an urban-type settlement. On October 29, the urban-type settlement was named "Vlasikha"; however, as of 2011, this name is not yet official pending the approval by the Government of Russia.

Administrative and municipal status
Within the framework of administrative divisions, it is incorporated as the closed administrative-territorial formation of Vlasikha—an administrative unit with the status equal to that of the districts. As a municipal division, the closed administrative-territorial formation of Vlasikha is incorporated as Vlasikha Urban Okrug.

References

Notes

Sources

Urban-type settlements in Moscow Oblast
Closed cities
Populated places established in 2009